Periclimenaeus bredini is a species of shrimp of the family Palaemonidae. Periclimenaeus bredini is found in the Gulf of Mexico.

References

Crustaceans described in 1972
Palaemonidae
Biota of the Gulf of Mexico